St Lite (セントライト, April 2, 1938 – February 1, 1965) was a Japanese racehorse.

Background
St Lite was a bay horse bred in Japan by Koiwai Nojo. During his racing career he was owned by Kato Yusaku and trained by Tanaka Kazuitichiro.

He was sired by the British stallion Diolite. His dam Flippancy (GB), was a daughter of Flamboyant.

Racing career
St Lite became the first winner of the Japanese Triple Crown when he captured Satsuki Sho (Japanese 2000 Guineas), Tokyo Yushun (Japanese Derby), and Kikuka Sho (Japanese St. Leger) in 1941.

Stud record
St Lite was retired to stud in 1942. He sired Saint O (Kikuka Sho) and Owens (Tenno Sho (Spring)), Oh Lite (Heiwa Sho). He was eighth on the sires list in 1950 and 1952 and ninth in 1951. St Lite's progeny won 253 races worth 32,207,750 yen. He died from decrepitude in 1965.

In 1984, he was inducted in JRA Hall of Fame horse.

Race photos

See also 
 Shinzan (Japanese Triple crown in 1964)
 Mr. C.B. (Japanese Triple crown in 1983)
 Symboli Rudolf (Japanese first undefeated Triple crown in 1984)
 Narita Brian (Japanese Triple crown in 1994)
 Deep Impact (Japanese undefeated Triple crown in 2005)
 Orfevre (Japanese Triple crown in 2011)
 Contrail (Japanese undefeated Triple crown in 2020)
 List of historical horses

Pedigree

References

1938 racehorse births
1965 racehorse deaths
Triple Crown of Thoroughbred Racing winners
Racehorses bred in Japan
Racehorses trained in Japan
Thoroughbred family 22-b